The 1895 New Jersey gubernatorial election was held on November 5, 1895. Republican nominee John W. Griggs defeated Democratic nominee Alexander T. McGill with 52.28% of the vote.

Griggs was the first Republican elected Governor of New Jersey since Marcus Lawrence Ward in 1865. His election culminated a political realignment in the state from slightly-but-solidly Democratic to Republican; Republicans would not lose another gubernatorial election until 1910.

General election

Candidates
William B. Ellis (Populist)
John W. Griggs, State Senator from Passaic County (Republican)
George B. Keim (Socialist Labor)
Alexander T. McGill, Chancellor of New Jersey (Democratic)
Henry W. Wilbur (Prohibition)

Results

References

1895
1895 New Jersey elections
New Jersey
November 1895 events